Ashilta is a rural locality (a selo) in Untsukulsky District, Republic of Dagestan, Russia. The population was 1,983 as of 2010. There are 8 streets.

Geography 
Ashilta is located 27 km northwest of Shamilkala (the district's administrative centre) by road. Chirkata is the nearest rural locality.

References 

Rural localities in Untsukulsky District